Hugh Purefoy Smith (16 October 1856 – 9 September 1939) was an English cricketer.  Smith was a right-handed batsman who bowled right-arm medium pace.  He was born at Lasham, Hampshire.

Smith made a single first-class appearance for Sussex against Surrey at the County Ground, Hove in 1878.  In Surrey's first-innings, he took the wicket of Swainson Akroyd for the cost of 82 runs from 30 overs.  In Sussex's first-innings, he was dismissed for 10 runs by Edward Barratt.  With Sussex following-on in their second-innings, he was dismissed for a duck by Frederick Johnson.  This was his only major appearance for Sussex.

He died at Brighton, Sussex on 9 September 1939.

References

External links
Hugh Smith at ESPNcricinfo
Hugh Smith at CricketArchive

1856 births
1939 deaths
People from East Hampshire District
English cricketers
Sussex cricketers